The thick-lipped catfish (Cinetodus crassilabris) is a species of catfish in the family Ariidae. It was described by Edward Pierson Ramsay and James Douglas Ogilby in 1886, originally under the genus Hemipimelodus. It is found in freshwater rivers in New Guinea. Its diet consists of insects and vascular plants.

References

Cinetodus
Fish described in 1886
Taxobox binomials not recognized by IUCN